Dau Shri Vasudev Chandrakar Kamdhenu Vishwavidyalaya is a state university located in Durg, Chhattisgarh, India. 

It was established in 2012 and offers courses in veterinary and animal sciences at various levels.

Constituent colleges
The university has four constituent colleges:
College of Veterinary Science & Animal Husbandry, Anjora, Durg
College of Dairy Science and Food Technology, Raipur
College of Fisheries, Kawardha
College of Veterinary Science and Animal Husbandry, Bilaspur

See also
University Grants Commission (India)

References 

2012 establishments in Chhattisgarh
Educational institutions established in 2012
Universities and colleges in Chhattisgarh
Education in Chhattisgarh
Veterinary schools in India